Židovice may refer to:

 Židovice (Litoměřice District), a village in the Czech Republic
 Židovice (Jičín District), a village in the Czech Republic